Pavel Fyodorovich Batitsky (27 June 1910 – 17 February 1984) was a Soviet military leader awarded the highest honorary title of Hero of the Soviet Union in 1965 and promoted to Marshal of the Soviet Union in 1968. Batitsky served in the Red Army from 1924 and was commander-in-chief of the Air Defense Forces from 1966 to 1978. Following the death of Joseph Stalin in 1953, he was chosen to execute Lavrentiy Beria, the former head of the NKVD.

Biography 
He was born in Kharkov, in the Russian Empire, and joined the Red Army in October 1924. At the age of 14, he entered the Kharkov Military Preparatory School (soon relocated to Poltava) and in 1926, was sent to study at the Military Cavalry School, graduating in 1929. From March 1929 to May 1935, he served in the cavalry and commanded a platoon and squad in the Belorussian Military District.

In 1938, he graduated with honors from the Frunze Military Academy. From September 1939 to December 1940, he was in China as Chief of Staff of Soviet military advisers at the headquarters of Chiang Kai-shek. Upon returning to the Soviet Union, he was made Chief of Staff of the 11th Motorized Machine Gun Artillery Brigade at Kaunas in the Baltic Special Military District. In March 1941, he was appointed Chief of Staff of the 202nd Motorized Division. Later that year, he took command of the 254th Rifle Division. Later, during World War II, he commanded the 73rd Rifle Corps (1943–1944) and the 128th Rifle Corps (1944–1945). After World War II he was Chief of the General Staff and Deputy Commander-in-Chief of the Soviet Air Forces (1950–1953).In December 1953, he was chosen personally to execute Lavrentiy Beria as part of a plot led by Nikita Khrushchev and assisted by the military forces of Marshal of the Soviet Union Georgy Zhukov (Batitsky was Colonel-General and First Deputy Commander of the Moscow Military District at the time).

Batitsky died in Moscow in 1984. He was buried in his Marshal of the Soviet Union uniform.

Honours and awards 
 Hero of the Soviet Union
 Five Orders of Lenin
 Order of the October Revolution
 Five Orders of the Red Banner
 Order of Kutuzov 1st class
 Order of Suvorov 2nd class
 Order of Kutuzov 2nd class
 Order for Service to the Homeland in the Armed Forces of the USSR 3rd class
 Campaign and Jubilee medals
 16 foreign decorations

References

1910 births
1984 deaths
Military personnel from Kharkiv
People from Kharkovsky Uyezd
Russians in Ukraine
Communist Party of the Soviet Union members
Sixth convocation members of the Supreme Soviet of the Soviet Union
Seventh convocation members of the Supreme Soviet of the Soviet Union
Eighth convocation members of the Supreme Soviet of the Soviet Union
Ninth convocation members of the Soviet of the Union
Tenth convocation members of the Supreme Soviet of the Soviet Union
Members of the Supreme Soviet of the Russian Soviet Federative Socialist Republic, 1955–1959
Members of the Supreme Soviet of the Russian Soviet Federative Socialist Republic, 1959–1963
Marshals of the Soviet Union
Soviet Air Defence Force officers
Soviet executioners
Frunze Military Academy alumni
Military Academy of the General Staff of the Armed Forces of the Soviet Union alumni
Soviet people of the Second Sino-Japanese War
Soviet military personnel of World War II from Ukraine
Heroes of the Soviet Union
Recipients of the Order of Lenin
Recipients of the Order of the Red Banner
Recipients of the Order of Kutuzov, 1st class
Recipients of the Order of Suvorov, 2nd class
Recipients of the Order of Kutuzov, 2nd class
Burials at Novodevichy Cemetery